The Army Public School, Jodhpur is a military school in Jodhpur, Rajasthan, India. It was established in 1990 and is part of the Indian Army Public Schools. It is affiliated to the Central Board of Secondary Education.

History
The school was started on 1 July 1992 for just primary classes with 247 pupils. After a few years, it was recognised by AWES. In July 1995, it added class IX. In 1996, class X was added with the first batch of 16 CBSE students, all of whom passed the board exam. From 2001, it started class XI but with only a science stream. In the following year, a commerce stream was added. There was no class XII until 2006 when the first batch of 13 students applied for the CBSE exam. The popularity of the school grew at that time due to lack of students so that civilians also had a chance of admission. On 1 July 2006, the humanities stream was added.

Houses
There are four houses in the school:
Tagore, named after Gurudev Rabindranath Tagore
Rajendra, named after Dr. Rajendra Prasad
Aryabhatta, named after the mathematician Aryabhatta
Raman, named after the scientist C. V. Raman

References

External links
https://www.apsjodhpur.com/about-us

Schools in Jodhpur
Schools in Rajasthan